William Gibson DD (1717 - 1754) was a Canon of Windsor from 1746 to 1754 and Archdeacon of Essex from 1747 to 1752.

Family

He was born in 1717, the son of Bishop Edmund Gibson of London.

Career

He was educated at Christ Church, Oxford and graduated BA in 1737, MA in 1740, BD and DD in 1751.

He was appointed:
Rector of Thorley, Hertfordshire
Rector of Gilston, Hertfordshire
Rector of St Botolph Bishopsgate 1743 - 1752
Rector of St Martin Ludgate 1741 - 1743
Prebendary of Rugmere in St Paul’s 1741 - 1743
Prebendary of Kentish Town in St Paul’s 1742 - 1746
Prebendarty of Chamberlainwood in St Paul’s 1742 - 1746
Archdeacon of Essex 1747 - 1752

He was appointed to the eighth stall in St George's Chapel, Windsor Castle in 1746 and held the canonry until 1754.

Notes 

1717 births
1754 deaths
Canons of Windsor
Alumni of Christ Church, Oxford
Archdeacons of Essex